Kalle Fredrik Åke Sture Westerdahl, born 4 August 1966 in Askim, Gothenburg Municipality) is a Swedish actor.

He has travelled around and played his monologue Man i djungeln.

Selected filmography
1988 - Xerxes
1993 - Allis med is (TV)
1994 - Bert
1994 - Sommarmord
1994 - Rapport till himlen (TV)
2000 - Pistvakt – En vintersaga (TV)
2000 - I väntan på bruden
2001 - Om inte
2004 - Kyrkogårdsön
2004 - Falla vackert
2007 - En riktig jul (TV, "Julkalendern")
2008 - Allt flyter
2009 - Wallander – Tjuven

References

External links

Kalle Westerdahl on Swedish Film Database

Living people
Swedish male actors
1966 births
People from Gothenburg